The dwarf bronze gecko (Ailuronyx tachyscopaeus) is a species of lizards in the family Gekkonidae endemic to Seychelles.

The dwarf bronze gecko is an arboreal species found in low-growing vegetation in woodland, usually in association with palms where it can reach high densities. It can also occur in coconut plantations and live in buildings. It is an adaptable species, but its range is small. It occurs in the Praslin National Park. It is oviparous and the eggs are glued to palm leaves.

References

Ailuronyx
Fauna of Seychelles
Endemic fauna of Seychelles
Reptiles described in 1996
Taxonomy articles created by Polbot